White Deer Independent School District is a public school district based in White Deer, Texas (USA).  Located in Carson County, the district extends into a small portion of Gray County.

In 2009, the school district was rated "recognized" by the Texas Education Agency.

Schools
White Deer High School
White Deer Elementary School

References

External links
 White Deer ISD

School districts in Carson County, Texas
School districts in Gray County, Texas